The 2012–13 Slovenian Football Cup was the 22nd season of the Slovenian Football Cup, Slovenia's football knockout competition.

Qualified clubs

2011–12 Slovenian PrvaLiga members
Celje
Domžale
Gorica
Koper
Maribor
Mura 05
Olimpija
Rudar Velenje
Triglav Kranj
Nafta (dissolved following the 2011–12 season)

Qualified through MNZ Regional Cups
Winners and runners-up of the regional MNZ cups.
MNZ Ljubljana: Bela Krajina, Kamnik
MNZ Maribor: Pesnica, Dravograd
MNZ Celje: Dravinja, Šmarje pri Jelšah
MNZ Koper: Cerknica, Ankaran Hrvatini
MNZ Nova Gorica: Tolmin, Brda
MNZ Murska Sobota: Tromejnik, Šalovci
MNZ Lendava: Odranci, Turnišče
MNZG-Kranj: Jesenice, Šenčur
MNZ Ptuj: Aluminij, Zavrč

First round
Maribor, Celje, Olimpija, Mura 05 and Tolmin joined the competition in the second round (round of 16).

Notes
Note 1: Zavrč qualified to the next round automatically, after Jesenice withdrew from the 2012–13 Cup edition.

Round of 16
The draw for the second round (round of 16) took place in Ljubljana at the headquarters of the Football Association of Slovenia on 3 September 2012.

Notes
Note 2: The match between Zavrč and Maribor was rescheduled from 19 September to 31 October, as Maribor played their first match of the 2012–13 UEFA Europa League on 20 September.

Quarter-finals
The draw for the third round (Quarter-finals) took place in Ljubljana at the headquarters of the Football Association of Slovenia on 8 October 2012. The quarter-final pairs were drawn together by footballer Tim Matavž, with each team playing one match at home and one away. At the time of the draw only seven quarter-finalist were known, as the round of 16 match between Zavrč and Maribor was rescheduled from 19 September to 31 October. However, the draw was possible because the teams were not seeded. The date of the quarter-finals match between Olimpija Ljubljana and Maribor was announced by the Football Association of Slovenia on 12 December 2012.

First leg

Notes
Note 3: The first leg of the quarter-finals match between Olimpija Ljubljana and Maribor was originally scheduled on 23 February 2013. However, after starting on schedule, the match was suspended in the 24th minute due to heavy snowfall. The match was then rescheduled for 27 February 2013, the date originally intended for the second leg match in Maribor.

Second leg

Notes
Note 4: The match between Dravinja and Celje was postponed from 31 October 2012 to 21 November 2012, due to bad conditions (flooded pitch).
Note 5: The second leg of the quarter-finals match between Maribor and Olimpija Ljubljana was originally scheduled on 27 February 2013. However, the match was then rescheduled to 6 March 2013, due to the cancellation of the first leg match.

Semi-finals
The draw for the fourth round (Semi-finals) took place in Ljubljana at the headquarters of the Football Association of Slovenia on 8 March 2013. The semi-final pairs were drawn together by Slovenia national football team manager Srečko Katanec, with each team playing one match at home and one away. The semi-final consists of three Styrian clubs (Aluminij Kidričevo, Celje, Maribor) and Triglav Kranj. The 2012–13 Cup edition is Maribor's tenth successive season, where they have qualified at least to a semi-final stage of the competition. The 2011–12 Slovenian Football Cup final was played between Celje and Maribor.

First leg

Notes
Note 6: The first leg of the semi-finals were rescheduled from 10 April 2013 to 1 May 2013, due to rescheduling of the matches in the Slovenian PrvaLiga.

Second leg

Notes
Note 7: The second leg of the semi-finals were rescheduled from 17 April 2013 to 8 May 2013, due to rescheduling of the matches in the Slovenian PrvaLiga.

Final

References
General

Specific

External links

Slovenian Football Cup seasons
Cup
Slovenia